Re:Fresh is the second extended play by South Korean singer Soyou. It was released by Starship Entertainment and distributed by LOEN Entertainment on October 4, 2018.

Release 
The EP was released on October 4, 2018, through several music portals, including MelOn and iTunes.

Commercial performance 
Re:Fresh debuted and peaked at number 19 on the Gaon Album Chart, on the week of October 6, 2018, dropping the chart the following week.

Track listing

Charts

References 

2018 EPs
Starship Entertainment EPs
K-pop EPs